Freckles are clusters of concentrated melanin which are most often visible on people with a fair complexion.

Freckles may also refer to:

 Freckles (novel), a 1904 American novel
 Freckles (1917 film), a 1917 film based on the novel
 Freckles (1928 film), a 1928 film based on the novel
 Freckles (1935 film), a 1935 film based on the novel
 Freckles (1960 film), a 1960 American film based on the novel
 Freckles Brown (1921–1987), American bull rider
 "Freckles", a song by Eves Karydas, 2021
 "Freckles", a song by Natasha Bedingfield from the album Pocketful of Sunshine, 2007
 Freckles, a type of candy decorated with nonpareils

See also
 Freckles and His Friends, a comic strip published in the US from the 1910s to the late 1970s